Pinkard is a surname. Notable people with the surname include:

John Henry Pinkard (1865–1934), American businessman, banker and spiritualist or quack doctor
Josh Pinkard (born 1986), American football player
Larry Pinkard (born 1992), American football player
Maceo Pinkard (1897–1962), American composer, lyricist and music publisher
Nichole Pinkard, American computer scientist
Ron Pinkard (born 1941), American actor
Terry Pinkard (born 1947), An American philosopher specializing in German philosophy.